Buffer Zone is one of the neighbourhoods of North Nazimabad Town in Karachi, Sindh, Pakistan, namely it's UC9. The Government of Pakistan reserved this land in 1950s as "Buffer Zone" from Urban sprawl in Karachi for future construction of Government offices and residential neighborhood for bureaucrats but in early 1960 the capital of Pakistan was transferred from Karachi to newly built Islamabad and this land was sold to land developers. This is where the Pakistani cricket star Sarfraz Ahmed lives.

See also
 Buffer Zone II

References

External links 
 Karachi Website

Neighbourhoods of Karachi
North Nazimabad Town
Karachi Central District